Haritz Albisua Laskurain (born 1 October 1992) is a Spanish professional footballer who plays for SD Leioa as a central midfielder.

Club career
Born in Soraluze-Placencia de las Armas, Gipuzkoa, Basque Country, Albisua was a SD Eibar youth graduate. He made his senior debut with the reserves in 2010, in Tercera División.

Alibsua made his first team debut on 27 November 2011, starting in a 2–1 home win against Gimnástica de Torrelavega in the Segunda División B championship. On 6 October of the following year, he was loaned to fourth tier club CD Elgoibar until the end of the season.

On 20 July 2013, Albisua signed for Club Portugalete, still in the fourth division. The following 29 May, he agreed to a one-year deal with third level club Barakaldo CF.

On 12 July 2016, Albisua moved to fellow third division side Lorca FC. On 25 January of the following year, he joined Lleida Esportiu on loan until June.

Despite being deemed surplus to requirements during the 2017 summer transfer window, Albisua was registered with the main squad and made his professional debut on 27 January 2018, coming on as a second-half substitute for Abel Gómez in a 1–5 Segunda División away loss against Rayo Vallecano.

References

External links

1992 births
Living people
People from Debabarrena
Spanish footballers
Sportspeople from Gipuzkoa
Footballers from the Basque Country (autonomous community)
Association football midfielders
Segunda División players
Segunda División B players
Tercera División players
SD Eibar footballers
Club Portugalete players
Barakaldo CF footballers
Lorca FC players
Lleida Esportiu footballers
Unionistas de Salamanca CF players
Real Balompédica Linense footballers
SD Leioa players